Owasso High School is a high school located within Tulsa County in Owasso, Oklahoma, United States. It is among the largest high schools in Oklahoma by enrollment with nearly 3,000 students.

The school is known for being involved in the Owasso Independent School District v. Falvo Supreme Court case.

Campus 
The high school consists of two campuses: the East Campus and the West Campus. The school also offers various concurrent academic programs for students through Tulsa Community College and Tulsa Technology Center.

Campus history 
Upon Oklahoma gaining statehood in 1907, the city of Owasso constructed its first public school (a three-story brick building that housed all of the district's grades) in what is now the city's downtown area. In 1965, a new high school (and what is now the Owasso 7th Grade Center) was built at the corner of 86th Street and Main Street, which served as the city's high school until a new one was constructed in 1975 at the corner of 86th Street and 129th Street. This served as the main campus of Owasso High School until a merger with the Owasso Mid-High School in 2017, after which the two schools would be referred to East Campus and West Campus, respectively.

Athletics
Owasso High School's mascot is the ram, although, before the 1950s, the school's mascot was the owl.

The school currently fields teams in 18 different high school sports, including:

 Baseball
 Basketball (Boys)
 Basketball (Girls)
 Cheer
 Cross Country
 Football
 Golf (Boys)
 Golf (Girls)
 Pom
 Soccer (Boys)
 Soccer (Girls)
 Softball
 Swimming (Boys & Girls)
 Tennis (Boys)
 Tennis (Girls)
 Track and Field
 Volleyball
 Wrestling

Football 
Owasso's varsity football program has won three state championships throughout its history. The team is currently led by Bill Blankenship, who has held the position as head coach since 2017. The team plays its home games at Owasso Stadium on the school's East Campus.

Owasso holds several football rivalries with other Oklahoma schools. These include the "Battle of the 'Burbs" with Bixby High School and the yearly Folds of Honor Patriot Bowl with Broken Arrow High School.

1974 Championship 
The Rams' first football title was a 1974 Class 3A co-championship shared with Ada after a 7–7 tie. The game was played at (what was then) Skelly Stadium at the University of Tulsa. The outcome of the game played a crucial role in the adoption of a new overtime rules format by the Oklahoma Secondary School Activities Association (OSSAA).

2017 Championship 
On December 1, 2017, Owasso defeated Union (Tulsa) 21–14 in Oklahoma's Class 6A-1 championship game at H. A. Chapman Stadium. This made Owasso the first school since 1995 other than Union or Jenks to win the state title in the classification for the state's largest schools.

2019 Championship 
Owasso won its third state title on December 7, 2019, by defeating the Jenks Trojans 14–6 in the Class 6A-1 championship game at the University of Central Oklahoma's Chad Richison Stadium.

Baseball 
Owasso's baseball team has won 14 state championships, including 11 since 1998. The program won its most recent title in the 2022 Class 6A championship by defeating Edmond Santa Fe 7–3. The team plays its home games at Stigall Field on the school's East Campus.

Owasso claims the most titles of any of the 32 teams in Oklahoma's 6A class (the next-highest being Union with 7 titles), as well as the second-most titles among all Oklahoma high schools.

Owasso Independent School District v. Falvo 

In October 1998, Kristja Falvo filed suit in the U.S. District Court for the Northern District of Oklahoma, alleging that the use of "peer-grading" within Owasso Public Schools violated the Family Educational Rights and Privacy Act (FERPA). FERPA authorizes the withholding of federal funds from public school districts that  "release any information from a student's education record" without permission from a "parent or eligible student." The district court ruled in favor of the school district, prompting Falvo to file an appeal with the United States Court of Appeals for the Tenth Circuit. The appellate court then overturned the decision of the district court, arguing that " the District Court erred when it resolved that the grading practice did not offend FERPA." The school district then appealed to the Supreme Court, with the case being argued in late November 2001.

The Supreme Court ruled unanimously in favor of Owasso Public Schools, citing that peer-graded papers do not constitute records "maintained by an educational agency or institution or by a person acting for such agency or institution." Justice Anthony Kennedy delivered the Court's opinion, stating:"Petitioners, supported by the United States as amicus curiae, contend the definition covers only institutional records—namely, those materials retained in a permanent file as a matter of course. They argue that records "maintained by an educational agency or institution" generally would include final course grades, student grade point averages, standardized test scores, attendance records, counseling records, and records of disciplinary actions—but not student homework or classroom work."

Notable alumni
 Randy Blake, kickboxer
 Dylan Bundy, Major League Baseball (MLB) player; class of 2011
 Aaron Colvin, pro football player with the Houston Texans
 Brian Flynn, MLB player
 Keon Hatcher, pro football player with the Oakland Raiders
 Jon Kolb, football player and strongman
 Pete Kozma, MLB player
 Shake Milton, NBA player Philadelphia 76ers
 Paul Smith, American and Canadian football player
 Braden Webb, professional baseball player

References

Public high schools in Oklahoma
Schools in Tulsa County, Oklahoma